Caleb Ellicott Finch (born July 4, 1939) is an American academic who is a professor at the USC Davis School of Gerontology. Finch's research focuses on aging in humans, with a specialization in cell biology and Alzheimer's disease.

Early life and education 
Finch was born in London in 1939, the son of American parents. At the time of his birth, his father was working for London branch of the National City Bank of New York. After the start of World War II, his family returned to New York City. Finch earned a Bachelor of Science degree in biophysics from Yale University and a PhD in biology from Rockefeller University.

Career 
He was the founding director of USC's NIH-funded Alzheimer Disease Research Center in 1984. In 1989, the university made him one of its twelve "University Distinguished Professors". He is a full professor in gerontology and biological sciences and an adjunct professor in departments of anthropology, psychology, physiology, and neurology. He was the chair of the National Research Council Committee on Biodemography of Aging. He is co-author of 520 scientific papers and six books, including The Biology of Human Longevity (Academic Press, 2007) and "The Role of Global Air Pollution in Aging and Disease" (Academic Press, 2017). He serves on the Scientific Advisory Board for the Cure Alzheimer's Fund.

References

External links
Faculty page

1939 births
Living people
American gerontologists
University of Southern California faculty